Real Zaragoza Club Deportivo and later simply Zaragoza Club Deportivo was a Spanish football club based in Zaragoza, founded in 1925 as result of the merger of Athletic Stadium (founded in 1919) and Zaragoza FC (founded in 1921). The club played its games at Campo de la Torre de Bruil, and in 1932 merged with Iberia SC to form the current Real Zaragoza.

History

Background
Zaragoza FC - (1921–1924) → ↓
Zaragoza FC - (1924–1925)
CD Fuenclara - (1918–1924) → ↑

Zaragoza FC - (1924–1925) → ↓
Zaragoza CD - (1925–1932)
Ath. Stadium - (1919–1924) → ↑

Iberia SC - (1916–1932) → ↓
Zaragoza FC - (1932–)
Zaragoza CD - (1925–1932) → ↑

Seasons

 2 seasons in Tercera División

External links
Official website of R. Zaragoza 

Sport in Zaragoza
Real Zaragoza
Association football clubs established in 1925
Association football clubs disestablished in 1932
Defunct football clubs in Aragon
1925 establishments in Spain
1932 disestablishments in Spain